Soltanabad Rural District may refer to:
 Soltanabad Rural District (Khuzestan Province)
 Soltanabad Rural District (Razavi Khorasan Province)